is a private university in Fukuyama, Hiroshima, Japan, established in 1994.

External links
 Official website 

Educational institutions established in 1994
Private universities and colleges in Japan
Universities and colleges in Hiroshima Prefecture
1994 establishments in Japan